Peoli may refer to:

Cecil Peoli (1894–1915), American aviator
Isidoro Malmierca Peoli (1930–2001), Cuban foreign minister and co-founder of the Cuban Communist Party
Juan Jorge Peoli (1825–1893), American painter; grandfather of Cecil Peoli
Peoli, Ohio, a town in Ohio, United States